Kids in Jazz (established 2012 in Norway) is an international jazz festival where children perform. The festival takes place in August, with concerts on numerous stages in Oslo.

Biography
Kids in Jazz was initiated as a cooperation project, involving Improbasen, Sapporo Junior Jazz School, Nasjonal Jazzscene, Oslo Jazzfestival, and Barnas Jazzhus. Once established, the festival demonstrated an international need for a meeting place for the youngest jazztalents and their tutors. In 2013 more countries joined, including Austria, Ukraine and Japan.

In 2014 Kids in Jazz established a cooperation with the official organizations for jazz in Denmark (JazzDanmark) and Sweden (Svensk Jazz). Kids in Jazz 2014 presented several concerts featuring young performers from Norway, Sweden, Denmark, Switzerland, Austria and Japan.
In 2014 the founder of Kids in Jazz Odd André Elveland received the award Ella-prisen for his work with children and jazz.

Profile
The aim of the festival is to give children around the world an opportunity to develop their talent, by performing and by meeting other kids with the same passion for music. Many of the young talents presented during Kids in jazz, are likely to be found in the next generation of international jazz performers.

References

External links

2012 establishments in Norway
Music festivals established in 2012
Jazz festivals in Norway
Music festivals in Oslo
Children's music festivals
Annual events in Norway
Summer events in Norway